Senator Beardsley may refer to:

John Beardsley (New York politician) (1783–1857), New York State Senate
Levi Beardsley (1785–1857), New York State Senate
Samuel Beardsley (1790–1860), New York State Senate
William S. Beardsley (1901–1954), Iowa State Senate